The women's trios competition at the 2002 Asian Games in Busan was held on 5 and 6 October 2002 at the Homeplus Asiad Bowling Alley.

Schedule
All times are Korea Standard Time (UTC+09:00)

Results

References 

2002 Asian Games Official Report, Pages 322–323
Results at ABF Website
Results

External links
Official Website

Women's trios